The Chicago Express was a professional basketball franchise based in Chicago, Illinois. The team was one of the original franchises of the World Basketball League, which began play in 1988. Michael Jordan, younger brother of Express star Larry Jordan, was a player of note in the National Basketball Association, primarily for the Chicago Bulls. The Express advanced to the WBL championship game in 1988, losing to the Las Vegas Silver Streaks 102–95 on September 9, 1988.

After the 1988 season, the franchise moved to Springfield, Illinois and played two more seasons as the Illinois Express before folding for good in late 1990.

While in Chicago, the Express played its home games at the Rosemont Horizon.

Sources
HighBeam

World Basketball League teams
1988 establishments in Illinois
Basketball teams established in 1988
Sports clubs disestablished in 1988
1988 disestablishments in Illinois